Mikel "Mike" Bronzoulis (born January 5, 1979) is an American mixed martial artist who most recently competed in the Lightweight division of Bellator. A professional competitor since 2007, Bronzoulis has competed for Strikeforce, Legacy FC, Titan FC, Shark Fights, and was a finalist on Spike TV's Bellator: Fight Master reality show.

Background
Bronzolis began practicing martial arts when he was around seven years old, when his father, a martial artist himself, brought the young Bronzoulis to a karate school. From the beginning, Bronzoulis had found his passion, eventually learning Tae Kwon Do, Tang Shu Do, Shotokan, Shotoru, American Freestyle, and kickboxing. When he turned 16, Bronzoulis spent most of his time at the Fairtex Thai kickboxing camp and also watched Jean-Claude Van Damme movies.

Bronzoulis is a lifetime registered sex offender, having been convicted of aggravated sexual assault of a 14-year-old girl in 1997.

Mixed martial arts career
Bronzoulis made his professional debut in 2007. On April 25, 2009, he fought UFC veteran Kamal Shalorus to a majority draw.

Shark Fights
Bronzoulis made his Shark Fights debut in 2010 at Shark Fights 12 where he defeated Anselmo Martinez via disqualification. His next fight under the organization was at Shark Fights 14: Horwich vs. Villefort against Lucas Lopes where he won via unanimous decision.

Legacy Fighting Championship
On March 20, 2010, Bronzoulis was defeated by Levi Forrest via unanimous decision at Legacy FC 2 for the Legacy Welterweight Title.

On November 5, 2010, Bronzoulis defeated Jonathan Harris at Legacy FC 4 via TKO due to punches in round one to win the Legacy FC Welterweight Championship.

On January 29, 2011, Bronzoulis defeated Joe Christoper at Legacy FC 5 via TKO due to punches in round three to retain the Legacy FC Welterweight Championship, he later vacated the title when he signed with Strikeforce.

On December 16, 2011, Bronzoulis returned to Legacy FC against Jorge Patino at Legacy FC 9 losing via unanimous decision.

On May 11, 2012, Bronzoulis lost to UFC vet Gerald Harris at Legacy FC 11 via split decision.

On November 16, 2012, Bronzoulis defeated Robert Shawn Machado at Legacy FC 15 via unanimous decision.

Strikeforce
On May 25, 2011, it was announced that Bronzoulis had signed a four-fight deal with Strikeforce.

Bronzoulis made his debut for the promotion on June 18, 2011, against WEC veteran Todd Moore at Strikeforce: Overeem vs. Werdum. He lost the fight via unanimous decision (29-28, 29–28, 29–28).

Bronzoulis rebounded from this loss just two months later when he defeated Chad Leonhardt via TKO in the third round on the undercard of Strikeforce Challengers: Gurgel vs. Duarte.

Bellator MMA
On May 6, 2013, it was announced that Bronzoulis would be featured as a participant on Bellator MMA's reality TV show Fight Master: Bellator MMA.

In his preliminary fight to get on the show, Bronzoulis defeated Gareth Joseph by unanimous decision. During the team selection, he chose Randy Couture to be his coach. In his second fight, Bronzoulis defeated Jason Norwood by knockout in the third round. In the quarter-finals, Bronzoulis faced friend Chris Lozano and won via unanimous decision. In the semifinals, he fought Eric Bradley and, despite being controlled for most of two rounds, mounted a comeback and won via TKO in the second round. He was set to face Joe Riggs in the tournament final scheduled to take place at Bellator 98, but the bout was canceled after Riggs suffered an eye injury. The bout eventually took place on November 2, 2013, at Bellator 106 and Bronzoulis lost via unanimous decision.

Post-Bellator
Bronzoulis faced Brandon Farran at Triple A MMA 4: Caged Hostility on January 16, 2014. Bronzoulis lost the fight via TKO (punches) in the first round, marking the first KO/TKO loss of his career.

Bronzoulis faced Keith Johnson at Titan FC 29 on August 22, 2014. He lost via rear naked choke submission in the third round.

Return to Legacy FC
Bronzoulis returned to the promotion as he faced Justin Reiswerg at Legacy FC 37 on November 14, 2014. He won the fight by submission in the second round, ending his three-fight losing streak over the past year.

In his next fight for the promotion, Bronzoulis faced Jonathan Harris at Legacy FC 39 on February 27, 2015.  He won the fight via TKO in the first round.

Championships and accomplishments
Bellator MMA
Fight Master: Bellator MMA Season 1 Runner Up
Legacy Fighting Championship
Legacy FC Welterweight Championship (One time)
 One successful title defense
 Legacy FC Lightweight Championship (One time)

Mixed martial arts record

|-
| Loss
| align=center| 
| Zane Kamaka	
| TKO (arm injury)
| X-1 49 - Lightweight Grand Prix
| 
| align=center| 1
| align=center| 5:00
| Honolulu, Hawaii, United States
| 
|-
| Loss
| align=center| 18–9–1
| Josh Thomson
| Submission (arm-triangle choke)
| Bellator 142: Dynamite 1
| 
| align=center| 3
| align=center| 0:39
| San Jose, California, United States
| 
|-
| Win
| align=center| 18–8–1
| Dave Burrow
| Decision (unanimous)
| Legacy FC vs. RFA Superfight Card
| 
| align=center| 5
| align=center| 5:00
| Robinsonville, Mississippi, United States
| 
|-
| Win
| align=center| 17–8–1
| Jonathan Harris
| TKO (punches)
| Legacy FC 39
| 
| align=center| 1
| align=center| 1:43
| Houston, Texas, United States
| 
|-
| Win
| align=center| 16–8–1
| Justin Reiswerg
| Submission (rear-naked choke)
| Legacy FC 37
| 
| align=center| 2
| align=center| 4:51
| Houston, Texas, United States
|
|-
| Loss
| align=center| 15–8–1
| Keith Johnson
| Submission (rear-naked choke)
| Titan FC 29: Ricci vs. Sotiropoulos
| 
| align=center| 3
| align=center| 3:31
| Fayetteville, North Carolina, United States
| 
|-
| Loss
| align=center| 15–7–1
| Brandon Farran
| TKO (punches)
| Triple A MMA 4: Caged Hostility
| 
| align=center| 1
| align=center| 0:43
| Fort Worth, Texas, United States
|
|-
| Loss
| align=center| 15–6–1
| Joe Riggs
| Decision (unanimous)
| Bellator 106
| 
| align=center| 3
| align=center| 5:00
| Long Beach, California, United States
| 
|-
| Win
| align=center| 15–5–1
| Robert Shawn Machado
| Decision (unanimous)
| Legacy FC 15
| 
| align=center| 3
| align=center| 5:00
| Houston, Texas, United States
| 
|-
| Win
| align=center| 14–5–1
| Danny Salinas
| KO (head kick)
| UWF: Tournament of Warriors Round 2
| 
| align=center| 2
| align=center| 1:47
| Laredo, Texas, United States
|
|-
| Loss
| align=center| 13–5–1
| Gerald Harris
| Decision (split)
| Legacy FC 11
| 
| align=center| 3
| align=center| 5:00
| Houston, Texas, United States
| 
|-
| Loss
| align=center| 13–4–1
| Jorge Patino
| Decision (unanimous)
| Legacy FC 9
| 
| align=center| 5
| align=center| 5:00
| Houston, Texas, United States
|
|-
| Win
| align=center| 13–3–1
| Chad Leonhardt
| TKO (leg kick and punches)
| Strikeforce Challengers: Gurgel vs. Duarte
| 
| align=center| 3
| align=center| 1:30
| Las Vegas, Nevada, United States
| 
|-
| Loss
| align=center| 12–3–1
| Todd Moore
| Decision (unanimous)
| Strikeforce: Overeem vs. Werdum
| 
| align=center| 3
| align=center| 5:00
| Dallas, Texas, United States
| 
|-
| Win
| align=center| 12–2–1
| Lucas Lopes
| Decision (unanimous)
| Shark Fights 14: Horwich vs. Villefort
| 
| align=center| 3
| align=center| 5:00
| Lubbock, Texas, United States
|
|-
| Win
| align=center| 11–2–1
| Joe Christopher
| TKO (punches)
| Legacy FC 5
| 
| align=center| 3
| align=center| 3:33
| Houston, Texas, United States
| 
|-
| Win
| align=center| 
| Jonathan Harris
| TKO (punches)
| Legacy FC 4
| 
| align=center| 1
| align=center| 3:43
| Houston, Texas, United States
| 
|-
| Win
| align=center| 9–2–1
| Anselmo Martinez
| DQ (unintentional knee to downed opponent)
| Shark Fights 12: Unfinished Business
| 
| align=center| 2
| align=center| 3:54
| Amarillo, Texas, United States
| 
|-
| Loss
| align=center| 8–2–1
| Levi Forrest
| Decision (unanimous)
| Legacy FC 2
| 
| align=center| 3
| align=center| 5:00
| Houston, Texas, United States
| 
|-
| Win
| align=center| 8–1–1
| Cleburn Walker
| TKO (punches)
| Steele Cage 2
| 
| align=center| 1
| align=center| 4:39
| Frisco, Texas, United States
| 
|-
| Draw
| align=center| 7–1–1
| Kamal Shalorus
| Draw (majority)
| KOK 6: Fists of Fury
| 
| align=center| 3
| align=center| 5:00
| Austin, Texas, United States
| 
|-
| Win
| align=center| 7–1
| Joshua Lee
| TKO (punches)
| Urban Rumble Championships 3	
| 
| align=center| 2
| align=center| 0:59
| Pasadena, California, United States
| 
|-
| Win
| align=center| 6–1
| Keith Schneider
| TKO (punches)
| Renaissance MMA 10
| 
| align=center| 2
| align=center| 4:42
| New Orleans, Louisiana, United States
| 
|-
| Win
| align=center| 5–1
| Mark Ortiz
| KO (punches)
| Katana Cagefighting: Conquest
| 
| align=center| 3
| align=center| 1:56
| Robstown, Texas, United States
| 
|-
| Win
| align=center| 4–1
| George Sweeney
| Submission
| STFL 3: War Zone
| 
| align=center| 1
| align=center| 1:22
| McAllen, Texas, United States
| 
|-
| Win
| align=center| 3–1
| Edwynn Jones
| Submission (rear-naked choke)
| Xp3: The Proving Ground
| 
| align=center| 1
| align=center| 1:23
| Houston, Texas, United States
| 
|-
| Win
| align=center| 2–1
| Paul Hansen
| TKO (punches)
| SCP: South Coast Promotions
| 
| align=center| 1
| align=center| 0:57
| Houston, Texas, United States
| 
|-
| Win
| align=center| 1–1
| Robert Larson
| TKO
| STFL 2: Aftershock
| 
| align=center| 1
| align=center| 2:41
| Edinburg, Texas, United States
| 
|-
| Loss
| align=center| 0–1
| Matt Rangel
| Submission (armbar)
| Renegades Extreme Fighting
| 
| align=center| 1
| align=center| 1:18
| Houston, Texas, United States
| 
|-

Mixed martial arts exhibition record

|-
| Win
| align=center| 4–0
| Eric Bradley
| TKO (punches) 
| Fight Master: Bellator MMA
| 
| align=center| 2
| align=center| N/A
| New Orleans, Louisiana, United States
| 
|-
| Win
| align=center| 3–0
| Chris Lozano
| Decision (unanimous) 
| Fight Master: Bellator MMA
| 
| align=center| 2
| align=center| 5:00
| New Orleans, Louisiana, United States
| 
|-
| Win
| align=center| 2–0
| Jason Norwood
| KO (punch)
| Fight Master: Bellator MMA
| 
| align=center| 3
| align=center| N/A
| New Orleans, Louisiana, United States
| 
|-
| Win
| align=center| 1–0
| Gareth Joseph
| Decision (unanimous)
| Fight Master: Bellator MMA
| 
| align=center| 2
| align=center| 5:00
| New Orleans, Louisiana, United States
|

See also
 List of Bellator MMA alumni
 List of male mixed martial artists

References

External links

1979 births
Living people
American male mixed martial artists
Welterweight mixed martial artists
Mixed martial artists utilizing taekwondo
Mixed martial artists utilizing Tang Soo Do
Mixed martial artists utilizing Shotokan
Mixed martial artists from Texas
American male taekwondo practitioners
American male karateka
American people of Greek descent